José Luis Bouza Pregal is a Spanish sprint canoer, who has been competing since the late 2000s. He won a silver medal in the C-1 5000 m event at the 2010 ICF Canoe Sprint World Championships in Poznań.

References

2010 ICF Canoe Sprint World Championships men's C-1 5000 m final results.  – accessed 21 August 2010
Canoe09.ca profile

Living people
Spanish male canoeists
Year of birth missing (living people)
ICF Canoe Sprint World Championships medalists in Canadian
21st-century Spanish people